Denis Kishkurno (born 16 May 1991) is a Belarusian professional footballer who plays for SMIautotrans Smolevichi.

External links
 
 
 Profile at pressball.by

1991 births
Living people
Belarusian footballers
FC Torpedo-BelAZ Zhodino players
Association football midfielders